Tampereen Palloilijat or TaPa is a Finnish football club, based in Tampere. In the past club also played ice hockey, they participated to first ever finnish championship in 1928. In 1931 they won finnish ice hockey championship.

Football
TaPa was founded in 1921. They have played five seasons in the Finnish top tier. Tampereen Palloilijat were founding member of Finnish FA Häme district. In 1924 club members build the first grass pitch of inner Finland to Kaleva district in Tampere, in opening match they won HIFK 3-2. In 1969 it merged with Tampellan Pallo and changed club name to Tampellan Palloilijat, Tampellan Pallo was founded only year before as a merger of Tampellan Terä and Tampereen Kalevan Pallo-Pojat. In 1974 they combined with Ilves Tampere together with Ilves-Kissat and Ilves continued as a leading club of Tampere. Ilves was founded in 1931 but played most of its history in the district level. Tampereen Palloilijat continued later on from lower levels.

Season to season

6 seasons in Mestaruussarja
16 seasons in Ykkönen
9 seasons in Maakuntasarja
4 seasons in Piirisarja
4 seasons in Nelonen
18 seasons in Vitonen
1 season in Kutonen

Ice Hockey
TaPa played in the first SM-sarja season. TaPa played a total of 4 seasons in the SM-sarja (1928, 1929, 1931 and 1932).

The best result for TaPa was the winning of SM-sarja in 1931

Notable players
Niilo Tammisalo
Risto Tiitola

References

External links
Official website
Finnish Wikipedia

Sport in Tampere
Ice hockey teams in Finland
Football clubs in Finland
Tampere